Jacek Andrzej Rossakiewicz (16 October 1956 – 24 September 2016) was a Polish painter, theoretician of art, philosopher and interior architect.

Biography 
His first paintings were created in the 1980s. The paintings were inspired by the Pure Form Theory of Stanisław Ignacy Witkiewicz (Witkacy) and entrenched in the tradition of 20th century European art. Beginning in 1985, J.A.R. showed in his paintings the social and political context associated with the criticism of Martial law in Poland (Dec. 1980). The contemplation of the different functions of this art led to the artist's formulation of the theory Art as Freedom (1985). Mostly inspired by Witkacy's grasp of the visible universe, in which the composition introduced the intended and directional tension, led Rossakiewicz to one interpretation of reality. The continuation of this philosophy led him in 1987 to the manifestation of social problems in his art. The next chapter of his art, The Everlasting Art, - 1989 was directly inspired from readings of the Old and New Testament. After 1989, Rossakiewicz started to create a series of evangelical paintings: Passion of Dunkirk and Saint John Passion. The Passion of Dunkirk is in the collection at the Modern Art Museum in Dunkirk, France.

He died 24 September 2016.

Rossakiewicz about his art: 
"In my understanding, to express man's spiritual life is to create art. The subject of the painting doesn’t matter. But the art has to originate in the inside, it has to be a result of man's life experiences. It cannot be simply planned; how to shock, how to draw attention to one's self, it cannot be done for money either. Because the spiritual and emotional state of an artist while painting, or working on a different work of art, is encoded in the painting and this energy is emanating from it."

Saint John Passion 
The cycle of 15 paintings (oil on canvas, 245x140 cm) with the prologue: The Transfiguration

References

External links
Official Website

Polish painters
Polish male painters
1956 births
2016 deaths